Chris Wyles (born 13 September 1983) is a former American-English rugby union player. Until his retirement from international rugby in January 2016, Wyles had represented the United States in three World Cups (2007, 2011 and 2015). He was the USA Eagles Captain in the 2015 World Cup. In the 2007/2008 and 2008/2009 season, he was Captain of the USA National Sevens team, a core team in the World Rugby Sevens series. In 2015, he was selected for the USA Olympic team to compete in the Sevens rugby event at the Rio Olympic Games.

In 2008, he joined Saracens in the English Premiership. In over 200 appearances, he has helped his club to win 4 Aviva Premiership Champion titles (2011, 2015, 2016, 2018) and two European Champions Cup (2016, 2017)

He played at wing, full back or centre. Wyles is the most-capped fullback of all time for the U.S. national team.

Background
Wyles was born in Stamford, Connecticut  but lived mostly in Allentown, Pennsylvania before he moved to his parents' native United Kingdom when he was 11 years old.[3] He then attended Haileybury and Imperial Service College in Hertford and went on to study Politics at the University of Nottingham.

Club career
Wyles' first professional club was the Championship team, Nottingham RFC. He then played for Northampton Saints, in the 2006/2007 season. It was during this period that he caught the eye of the USA Eagles coaching team and this eventually resulted in his involvement in the IRB Sevens World Series and the 2007 Rugby World Cup in France.

Wyles joined Saracens in summer of 2008, after impressive performances in the 2007 Rugby World Cup. Eddie Jones, who was on the Springboks coaching team, saw Wyles' potential and when Jones became Director of Rugby at Saracens, he brought him to the club.[4] Wyles debuted for Saracens on 12 September 2008 against the Sale Sharks.

In the 2009/2010 season he was a regular starter on the wing, playing in the Saracens team that took on Leicester in the final of the English Premiership. For his performances during the 2009/10 season, Wyles was nominated for Player of the Season by Brendan Venter.

Following on from that season, Wyles became a key figure in the successful 2010/11 Premiership winning side, beating Leicester 22-18 in the Final.

In the 2014/15 season, Wyles scored 12 tries, tying for second highest scorer in the English Premiership.[5] One of these tries helped Saracens to a second Premiership title by defeating Bath 28-16 in the final.

The 2015/2016 season was a major achievement year for Saracens, winning the Premiership Title for a third time, overcoming Exeter 28-20 (with Wyles scoring a try in the final for the second year running) and taking the European Champions Cup, 21-9 against Racing 92.

The 2016/17 season was also a huge achievement for Saracens, winning the European Championship for a second year in a row, beating Clermont Auvergne in Edinburgh 28-17. Wyles made his 50th European appearance during this season.

Wyles has now contributed over 60 tries for his Club, 23 of those scored in European Competition.

As of the 2017/18 season Wyles holds the record for most tries scored in the Premiership semi-final rounds with five. Wyles went on to score two tries in the final as Saracens claimed their fourth Premiership title in eight years with a 27-10 win over Exeter at Twickenham; these were his third and fourth tries scored in a victorious Premiership final after getting one in 2015 and one in 2016.

Wyles retired in 2018. He then started working for Wolfpack lager, with former team-mate Alistair Hargreaves.

International career

Wyles first represented the USA National Rugby Sevens team at the 2007 Hong Kong Sevens. From there, he went on to captain the USA team in the IRB Sevens World Series. During his time with the USA National Sevens team, he scored an impressive 54 tries in 13 tournaments.

Wyles earned his first XV's cap at the Churchill Cup in 2007 against England Saxons before going on to play Fullback for the Eagles in the 2007 Rugby World Cup in France. His performances in the World Cup led him to be named the American Rugby News 'Player of the Year'.[7]  He continued to be a regular starter at Fullback for the USA National team after the 2007 World Cup.

In 2009, Wyles was included in the USA Eagles team of the decade by RugbyMag, a leading US rugby publication.[8] Wyles continued his form for the USA team, playing in the 2011 Rugby World Cup in New Zealand, finishing as the Eagles top points scorer. His performances for club and country won him the 2012 Player of the Year award for American rugby.[9]

Wyles participated in his third and final World Cup in England in 2015. He was appointed Captain of the USA National team for this event.

In January 2016, Wyles announced his retirement from international XVs duty with the Eagles. He had amassed 222 points for the National team over his 54 cap career, scoring 16 tries and 142 points with the boot. His future intent was to focus on the remaining years of his contract with Saracens FC in England and to push for selection to the USA Olympic Team for the Rio 2016 Olympic Summer Games.[10]

Wyles reached his Olympic goal by playing with the USA National Sevens Team in Rio in August 2016.

International Tries

References

External links

 
 USA Rugby
 Aviva Premiership Rugby
 
 

1983 births
Living people
Alumni of the University of Nottingham
American emigrants to England
American expatriates in England
American people of English descent
American rugby union players
British rugby union players
Northampton Saints players
Nottingham R.F.C. players
Olympic rugby sevens players of the United States
People educated at Haileybury and Imperial Service College
Rugby sevens players at the 2016 Summer Olympics
Rugby union players from Connecticut
Saracens F.C. players
Sportspeople from Allentown, Pennsylvania
Sportspeople from Stamford, Connecticut
United States international rugby sevens players
United States international rugby union players